Howard Edward Kimbo (November 3, 1904 – May 26, 1978) was an American Negro league pitcher in the 1930s.

A native of Low Moor, Virginia, Kimbo played for the Pittsburgh Crawfords in 1932. He died in Pittsburgh, Pennsylvania in 1978 at age 73.

References

External links
Baseball statistics and player information from Baseball-Reference Black Baseball Stats and Seamheads

1904 births
1978 deaths
Pittsburgh Crawfords players
Baseball pitchers
Baseball players from Virginia
People from Alleghany County, Virginia
20th-century African-American sportspeople